The Rand McNally Building (1889–1911) in Chicago, designed by Burnham and Root, was the world's first all-steel framed skyscraper.

History 
The building was located at 160–174 Adams Street (on the south side between LaSalle and Wells) and also fronted #105–#119 on the backside (Quincy Street). It was erected in 1889 at a cost of $1 million. The general offices of the Chicago, Milwaukee & St. Paul Railway were located here on the 2nd and 3rd floors, as were the headquarters of the World's Columbian Exposition, on the 4th and 5th. The Long Distance Telephone Company (Quincy Street side) allowed patrons the ability to telephone New York City, a novelty at the time.

It was demolished in 1911 and a larger building of that era still stands on the site.  For many years, it housed the headquarters of the City National Bank & Trust Company.

See also 
 Early skyscrapers

References

Burnham and Root buildings
Commercial buildings completed in 1890
Demolished buildings and structures in Chicago
Skyscraper office buildings in Chicago
Buildings and structures demolished in 1911
1890 establishments in Illinois
1911 disestablishments in Illinois